Anuška Ferligoj is a Slovenian mathematician, born August 19, 1947 in Ljubljana, Slovenia, whose specialty is statistics and network analysis. Her specific interests include multivariate analysis (theory and application in social sciences, medicine, etc.), cluster analysis (constraints, multi-criteria clustering), social network analysis (blockmodeling, reliability and validity of network measurement), methodological research of public opinion, analysis of scientific networks. She is Fellow of the European Academy of Sociology.

She is a Professor Emeritus (2020) at the University of Ljubljana, Slovenia, and has been employed by the Faculty of Social Sciences since 1972. In the 2003—2005, she was the dean of the Faculty of Social Sciences. In 1992 – 2012, she was the head of the Centre for Methodology and Informatics at the Institute of Social Sciences (currently – its associate member). In 2002 – 2013, she headed the Graduate Program on Statistics, and in 2012 – 2020 – the Master program on Applied Statistics. Since 2017, she is an academic supervisor of the International Laboratory for Applied Network Research of National Research University Higher School of Economics in Moscow, Russia.

She is an elected member of the European Academy of Sociology and International Statistical Institute, and has been a member of boards of the International Network for Social Network Analysis, International Federation of Classification Societies, and International Sociological Association. She was an editor of the journal Advances in Methodology and Statistics (Metodološki zvezki) in 1987 – 2012. She has been a member of the editorial boards of several scientific journals, including Methodology, Statistics in Transition, Bulletin of Sociological Methodology, Structure and Dynamics: eJournal of Anthropology and Related Sciences, Journal of Classification, Journal of Mathematical Sociology, and Social Networks.

She was a Fulbright scholar in 1990—1991 and visiting professor at the University of Pittsburgh (1996) and at the University of Vienna (2009/10). She was awarded the title of Ambassador of Science of the Republic of Slovenia in 1997. The book Generalized Blockmodeling received Harrison White Outstanding Book Award given by Mathematical Sociology Section at the American Sociological Association. Jointly with Vladimir Batagelj, she received Simmel award from the International Network for Social Network Analysis and was a keynote speaker at the XXVI Sunbelt Social Networks Conference in 2007.

Early life and education 
Anuška Ferligoj obtained her B.S. in Mathematics and Physics in 1971, and her M.S. in Operational Research in 1979 from the University of Ljubljana. In 1983 she obtained her Ph.D. in Information Science from the same university under the supervision of Professor Branislav Ivanović.

Since 1972, she was employed as Assistant, Assistant Professor, Associate Professor and finally from 1994 as Full Professor at the Faculty of Social Sciences.

Research and career 
In 1990—1991, Anuška Ferligoj received Fulbright Award, visiting University of Pittsburgh. There she worked with Professor Patrick Doreian on research on connecting cluster and network analysis.

In the 2003—2005, Anuška Ferligoj was the first female dean of the Faculty of Social Sciences. She organized the Centre of Methodology and Informatics at the Institute of Social Sciences (Faculty of Social Sciences), in 1992 and led it until 2012. She initiated the Graduate Program on Statistics in 2002, heading it until 2013 and the Master program on Applied Statistics in 2012, heading it up to 2020. Since 2017, she is the academic supervisor of the International Laboratory for Applied Network Research of National Research University Higher School of Economics in Moscow, Russia.

Anuška Ferligoj is a fellow of the European Academy of Sociology and elected member of the International Statistical Institute. She has been a member of boards of the International Network for Social Network Analysis, International Federation of Classification Societies, and Research Committee RC33 on Logic and Methodology at the International Sociological Association. She was a member of other international and domestic societies and associations, including Classification Society of North America, Psychometric Society. She is a member of the Mathematical, Physical and Astronomical Society of Slovenia, Statistical Society of Slovenia (being its chair in 1982 – 1983), and Sociological Association of Slovenia.

Anuška Ferligoj was the head of the research program Social Science Methodology, Statistics and Informatics (1998-2019) which was selected among the best research programs financed by the Slovenian Research Agency in the years 2005 and 2006. She led other research projects, coordinated ESF ECRP project (2010-2012) where co-authorship networks of Slovenian researchers were studied. She also participated at TEMPUS-JPCR project and at two COST Action projects (TD 1306 and CA 15109).

She was the president of the Statistical Council of the Republic of Slovenia (2007-2021) and a member of the European Statistical Advisory Committee (ESAC) (2011-2015). She was a member of the Scientific Advisory Board of the Austrian Platform for Surveys, Methods and Empirical Analysis – PUMA (2014-2019) and of the Scientific Council of the Slovenian Research Agency (2011-2015).

Academic service
Anuška Ferligoj organized more than 30 international conferences, including the conferences sponsored by International Sociological Association's (ISA) research committee RC33 on Logic and Methodology (1988), International Network for Social Network Analysis - SUNBELT (2004), International Federation of Classification Societies - IFCS (2006), European Survey Research Association - ESRA (2013) and the first meeting of the COST Action 15109 (2016).

Anuška Ferligoj was founding editor of the journal Advances in Methodology and Statistics (Metodološki zvezki) in 1987 – 2012. Currently, she is a member of the editorial board of this journal, and of the journals Methodology, Statistic in Transition, Bulletin of Sociological Methodology, Corvinus Journal of Sociology and Social Policy, and Bilten Statističnega društva Slovenije (being its editor in 1982 – 1983). She was a member of the editorial boards of Structure and Dynamics: eJournal of Anthropology and Related Sciences, Journal of Classification, Journal of Mathematical Sociology, Social Networks, Statistical Analysis and Data Mining, Statistical Theory & Method Abstracts, Advances in Data Analysis and Classification, IFCS Newsletter, Statistička revija. She also edited a special double issue of the journal Quality & Quantity (1989) and a special issue of the journal Advances in Data Analysis and Classification (2011). She edited several proceedings of papers presented at the international scientific conferences on statistics and methodology that she organized.

Anuška Ferligoj was a visiting professor at the University of Pittsburgh (1996) and at the University of Vienna (2009/10). She took part in Invited Colloquia at the universities and institutes in Austria, Belgium, Croatia, France, Germany, Hungary, Italy, the Netherlands, Russia, Serbia, Slovakia, Spain, and USA.

Awards and honours 
Anuška Ferligoj received Boris Kidrič Fund Award in 1990. She was a Fulbright scholar in 1990—1991 at the University of Pittsburgh. She was awarded the title of Ambassador of Science of the Republic of Slovenia in 1997. In 1998, she received Award of Rok Petrović Foundation for mentoring diploma thesis. She twice received awards of Statistical Society of Slovenia – in 1997, and in 2012 (Marijan Blejec award).

In 1999, she received Award for the best presentation at the section on Data Mining at the 17th SAS European Users Group International Conference. The book Generalized Blockmodeling that she coauthored received Harrison White Outstanding Book Award by Mathematical Sociology Section of the American Sociological Association in 2007. Jointly with Vladimir Batagelj, she received Simmel award from the International Network for Social Network Analysis and was a keynote speaker at the XXVI Sunbelt Social Networks Conference in 2007.

In 2007 and 2008, students at the Faculty of Social Science chose her as the best professor. She received Doctor et Professor Honoris Causa at Eötvös Loránd University in Budapest in 2010, and Golden Plaque of University of Ljubljana in 2012. In 2020, she became a Professor Emeritus of the University of Ljubljana.

Selected bibliography 
Anuška Ferligoj is an author of scientific papers in the international journals in the field of methodology, statistics and social network analysis, and chapters in the monographs. Her most important books include: 
 Patrick Doreian, Vladimir Batagelj, Anuška Ferligoj, Mark Granovetter (Series Editor), Generalized Blockmodeling (Structural Analysis in the Social Sciences), Cambridge University Press 2004
 Anuška Ferligoj, Rener, T., & Ule, M. 1990. Ženska, zasebno, politično ali" Ne vem, sem neodločena". Znanstveno in publicistično središče. URL: 
 Anuška Ferligoj. 1995, 1997. Osnove statistike na prosojnicah. Samozaložba. URL:  
 Ferligoj, A., Leskošek, K., & Kogovšek, T. 1995. Zanesljivost in veljavnost merjenja. Fakulteta za družbene vede. URL:  
 Blaženka, K., Franc, A., Alojzija, D. U., Anuška, F., & Matjaž, O. 1994, 2001. Statistični terminološki slovar. Ljubljana: Statistično društvo Slovenije: Statistični urad Republike Slovenije. URL: 
 Vladimir Batagelj, Anuška Ferligoj, & Žiberna, A. (Editors). Data Science and Classification, Springer, 2006. URL: 
 Vladimir Batagelj, Patrick Doreian, Anuška Ferligoj, & Kejžar, N. 2014. Understanding large temporal networks and spatial networks: Exploration, pattern searching, visualization and network evolution. John Wiley & Sons. URL:  
 Patrick Doreian, Vladimir Batagelj, & Anuška Ferligoj (Editors). Advances in Network Clustering and Blockmodeling. John Wiley & Sons, 2020. URL: 
 ResearcherId: A-3675-2009

See also 
 Aleš Žiberna

References

External links 
 Short biography of Prof Dr Anuška Ferligoj
 Personal page of Anuška Ferligoj at the University of Ljubljana
 Personal page of Anuška Ferligoj at Higher School of Economics
 Personal bibliography of Anuška Ferligoj in COBISS
 ResearcherID/Publons profile of Anuška Ferligoj: A-3675-2009
 Scopus AuthorID of Anuška Ferligoj: 6602487611
 

1947 births
Living people
21st-century Slovenian mathematicians
20th-century Slovenian mathematicians
Academic staff of the University of Ljubljana
Scientists from Ljubljana
Women sociologists
20th-century women mathematicians
Network scientists
University of Pittsburgh faculty
Slovenian statisticians
Yugoslav mathematicians